Eiko Kaneta ( Kaneta Eikō; 30 December 1942 – 17 June 2022) was a Japanese politician. A member of the Liberal Democratic Party, he served in the House of Representatives from 1993 to 2005.

Kaneta died in Tokyo on 17 June 2022 at the age of 79.

References

1942 births
2022 deaths
Members of the House of Representatives (Japan)
20th-century Japanese politicians
21st-century Japanese politicians
Liberal Democratic Party (Japan) politicians
Chuo University alumni
People from Asahikawa